Non Nước Pagoda is a Buddhist temple in Sóc Sơn, Hanoi. The main attraction is a bronze Buddha.

References

Buddhist temples in Hanoi